Steph Reynolds (born 23 October 1993) is a Welsh professional rugby union player who used to play for Gloucester. He is now settled down in his home town of Chepstow.

In the 2015 Singha Sevens Series he broke the record for most tries scored in the tournament's history scoring his 20th try against Harlequins in the Cup Quarter-Final, only to be overtaken by Sale Sharks’ Paulo Odogwu a year later.

References

External links
Gloucester Rugby Profile
ESPN scrum Profile

Living people
1993 births
Gloucester Rugby players
Rugby union players from Newport, Wales
Welsh rugby union players
Rugby union wings